Vadim Shamilyevich Shakshakbayev (born 9 October 1971) is a former speed skater who represented the Soviet Union, the Commonwealth of Independent States, and Kazakhstan, in that order. Shakshakbayev born in Petropavl, where he started his sporting career at the Dynamo Petropavl club. After the 1997–98 season, Shakshakbayev ended his speed skating career. He was a vice-president of Kazakhstan Engineering group until 2012. He also served as the president of the Barys Astana of the Kontinental Hockey League in 2012–13 KHL season.

Personal records

References

External links
 Vadim Shakshakbayev's Profile at the ISU
 Vadim Shakshakbayev at the SpeedSkatingStats.com

1971 births
Soviet male speed skaters
Kazakhstani male speed skaters
Speed skaters at the 1992 Winter Olympics
Speed skaters at the 1994 Winter Olympics
Speed skaters at the 1998 Winter Olympics
Olympic speed skaters of the Unified Team
Olympic speed skaters of Kazakhstan
Speed skaters at the 1996 Asian Winter Games
Medalists at the 1996 Asian Winter Games
Asian Games medalists in speed skating
Asian Games bronze medalists for Kazakhstan
People from Petropavl
Living people